Cyclostrema quinquecarinatum is a species of sea snail, a marine gastropod mollusk in the family Liotiidae.

Distribution
This species occurs in the Gulf of Oman.

References

 Trew, A., 1984. The Melvill-Tomlin Collection. Part 30. Trochacea. Handlists of the Molluscan Collections in the Department of Zoology, National Museum of Wales

External links
 To World Register of Marine Species

quinquecarinatum
Gastropods described in 1906